War is a 2014 Swiss drama film directed by Simon Jaquemet. It was one of seven films shortlisted by Switzerland to be their submission for the Academy Award for Best Foreign Language Film at the 88th Academy Awards, but it lost out to Iraqi Odyssey.

Cast
 Sascha Gisler as Dion 
 Benjamin Lutzke as Matteo 
 Ella Rumpf as Ali

References

External links
 

2014 films
2014 drama films
Swiss drama films
Swiss German-language films
2010s German-language films